Brian Kesinger (born June 20, 1975 in Los Angeles, California) is an American illustrator, author and animator who has worked at Walt Disney Studios for 20+ years. His works are steeped in Victorian steampunk art.

Born into a family of musicians, he was the only one not able to play an instrument. His fondness for drawing was so apparent that his parents supported his artistic training throughout his school days. He started drawing steampunk art long before the term was coined. In 2000 he did the layout and background design for Walt Disney's film Atlantis: The Lost Empire. It was during this period that he developed a fondness for drawing submarines, gears and similar gadgets. Following this he became involved with the film Treasure Planet and grew to like tall ships and sci-fi. Other films he has worked on include Winnie the Pooh, Tarzan, Tangled, Chicken Little, Home on the Range, Bolt and Meet the Robinsons.

Brian Kesinger was raised on a steady diet of Walt Disney creations by parents who felt it important for him to be exposed to art. He was accepted at the Walt Disney Animation Studios in Burbank, California, during his senior year at high school, becoming in 1996 at age 18 the youngest animator in the history of the company. He started as a layout artist on the film Tarzan and in his career with Disney Animation has filled many positions ranging from visual development to story artist. In 2011 he received the Annie Award for his story work on Disney's  Prep and Landing, with his most recent film at Disney being the Academy Award-nominated Wreck-It Ralph. In Wreck-It Ralph Kesinger's voice is used for Kano from Midway Games's Mortal Kombat franchise. Away from his office he has created fantasy steampunk worlds peopled with memorable characters under the banner of "Tea Girls", illustrations using tea-stain washes and finished in ink and watercolours, including a portrait of steampunk chanteuse Veronique Chevalier.

Two of his most popular characters are the unlikely duo of Victoria Prismall, an independent young lady, and Otto (Italian for 'eight'), her live-in octopus who is a friend, butler and pet. They have appeared in books, prints, T-shirts, and more. Kesinger has published his first illustrated book on the couple, Walking Your Octopus: A Guide to the Domesticated Cephalopod. He describes it as "a satirical look at how we all can get a little carried away with how we raise our pets. It’s certainly inspired by my own dog Scout but also inspired by the ups and downs of raising two young children with my wife. My hope is that the book speaks to not only steampunk fans but pet owners and parents as well." Thirty full-page illustrations portray the couple at home and about, bathing, biking, dating, cooking, playing croquet, pumpkin carving, and other activities necessary for the spiritual well-being of an intelligent and worldly octopus.

Kesinger finds it entertaining to draw the octopus and is constantly challenged by having to find things for each tentacle to do. In that sense an octopus is a natural at multi-tasking and has enthralled a great many people. Cephalopods generally have become a theme animal for steampunk, so that Kesinger found the choice of octopus as Victoria's soulmate an easy one to make. The popularity of Otto and Victoria, though, came as a surprise, as did the fan art, tattoos and the appearance of girls cosplaying Victoria at conventions all over the country. He plans to produce a full-length film featuring Otto and Victoria’s adventures, purely to satisfy his own wish for a well-rendered steampunk animated film.

Kesinger created a mashup of Kylo Ren and Darth Vader and the comic strip Calvin and Hobbes. It also stars Kylo's parents, Princess Leia and Han Solo.

References

External links

Storytelling with Brian Kesinger
Brian Kesinger on fanart
Brian Kesinger's Tea Girls
More Tea Girls
Otto and Victoria gallery
Gallery of Brian Kesinger works
Gallery
Deviant Art
 Facebook
Twitter
Tumblr

Steampunk
American illustrators
American male writers
American animators
Fictional octopuses
Year of birth missing (living people)
Place of birth missing (living people)
Walt Disney Animation Studios people
Living people